Camptoprosopella dolorosa is a species of fly in the family Lauxaniidae.

References

Lauxaniidae
Insects described in 1903
Taxa named by Samuel Wendell Williston
Diptera of North America